Karpoori Thakur (24 January 1924 – 17 February 1988) was an Indian politician from the Bihar state. He was popularly known as Jan Nayak (Hindi for people's hero). He served as the Chief Minister of Bihar from December 1970 to June 1971 (Socialist Party/Bharatiya Kranti Dal), and from December 1977 to April 1979 (Janata Party).

Biography 
Karpoori Thakur was born in the Nai caste to Gokul Thakur and Ramdulari Devi at Pitaunjhia (now Karpuri Gram) village in Samastipur District of Bihar. He was influenced by nationalistic ideas as a student, and joined the All India Students Federation. As a student activist, he left his graduate college to join the Quit India Movement. For his participation in the Indian independence movement, he spent 26 months in prison.

After India gained independence, Thakur worked as a teacher in his village's school. He became a member of the Bihar Vidhan Sabha in 1952 from Tajpur constituency as a Socialist Party candidate. He was arrested for leading P & T employees during the general strike of the Central Government employees in 1960. In 1970, he undertook a fast unto death for 28 days to promote the cause of Telco labourers.

Thakur was a votary of Hindi language, and as the education minister of Bihar, he removed English as the compulsory subject for the matriculation curriculum. It is alleged that the Bihari students suffered due to the resulting low standards of English-medium education in the state. Thakur served as a minister and Deputy Chief Minister of Bihar, before becoming the first non-Congress socialist Chief Minister of Bihar in 1970. He also enforced total prohibition of alcohol in Bihar. During his reign, many schools and colleges were established in his name in the backward areas of Bihar.

Academic S N Malakar, who belongs to one of the MBCs
of Bihar and had participated in the agitation supporting 
Karpoori Thakur’s reservation policy in the 1970s as a student 
activist belonging to the All India Students Federation (AISF) 
contends that the subaltern classes of Bihar – MBCs, dalits and upper OBCs had already gained confidence during the time of 
the Janata Party government.

Chet Ram Tomar of Bulandshahr was his close ally.
A socialist leader, Thakur was close to Jaya Prakash Narayan. During the emergency in India (1975–77), he and other prominent leaders of Janata Party led the "Total Revolution" movement aimed at non-violent transformation of the Indian society.

In the 1977 Bihar Legislative Assembly election, the ruling Indian National Congress suffered a heavy defeat at the hands of Janata Party. Janata Party was a recent amalgam of disparate groups including Indian National Congress (Organisation), Charan Singh's Bharatiya Lok Dal (BLD), Socialists and Hindu Nationalists of Jana Sangh. The sole purpose of these groups joining together was to defeat Prime Minister Indira Gandhi, who had imposed a nationwide emergency and curtailed many freedoms. There were also social cleavages with Socialists and BLD representing backward castes and Congress(O) and Jana Sangh the upper castes.

After the Janata Party came to power, Thakur became Chief Minister of Bihar for the second time by winning the legislative party election against Bihar Janata Party President Satyendra Narayan Sinha, formerly of Congress [O], by a vote of 144 to 84. Infighting in the party broke over the question of Thakur's decision to implement the Mungeri Lal Commission report, that recommended the institution of reservations for Backward Castes in government jobs. Upper caste members of the Janata Party tried to water down the reservation policy by unseating Thakur as Chief Minister. To wean away Dalit MLAs, Ram Sundar Das, a Dalit himself, was nominated as the candidate. Though both Das and Thakur were socialists, Das was considered more moderate and accommodating than the Chief Minister. Thakur resigned and Das became the Chief Minister of Bihar on 21 April 1979. The reservation law was weakened by allowing upper castes to obtain a greater percentage of government jobs. The internal tensions in the Janata Party caused it to split into multiple factions which led to Congress to return to power in 1980. However, he could not last his full term because he lost the leadership battle in 1979 from Ram Sundar Das whom his adversaries placed against him and was replaced as chief minister.

When Janata Party split in July 1979, Karpoori Thakur sided with the outgoing Charan Singh faction. He was elected from Samastipur (Vidhan Sabha constituency) to Bihar Vidhan Sabha as Janata Party (Secular) candidate in 1980 elections. His party changed its name to Bharatiya Lok Dal later, and Thakur was elected to Bihar Vidhan Sabha as its candidate in 1985 election from Sonbarsa constituency. He passed away before this Vidhan Sabha could complete its term.

Thakur was known as the champion of the poor. He introduced reservation for the backward classes in the Government jobs, in 1978. In 1977; Devendra Prasad Yadav resigned from the Bihar Vidhan Sabha and paved the way for Thakur to contest the Phulparas Vidhan Sabha constituency by-election. Thakur won by the margin of 65000 votes, defeating Ram Jaipal Singh Yadav of INC.

Thakur served as the President of Samyukta Socialist Party. He is called a mentor to the prominent Bihari leaders such as Lalu Prasad Yadav, Ram Vilas Paswan, Devendra Prasad Yadav and Nitish Kumar.

In Memory 

Karpoori Thakur's birthplace, Pitaunjhia, was renamed to Karpuri Gram (Hindi for "Karpuri village") after his death in 1988. 
The Jan Nayak Karpuri Thakur Vidhi Mahavidyalaya (Law College) in Buxar is also named after him.
Bihar Government opened Jannayak Karpoori Thakur Medical College in Madhepura. 
The Department of Posts released a commemorative stamp in his memory. 
Jan Nayak Express Train running between Darbhanga & Amritsar  by Indian Railway. 
The government has taken immense commemorative measures that include naming several stadiums after Jan Nayak Karpuri Thakur in the state, establishment of scores of colleges and statues in most of the districts, Karpuri Thakur Museum, Jan Nayak Karpuri Thakur hospitals in Samastipur and Darbhanga, publication of Karpuri Thakur's speeches in legislative and documentary formation on Karpuri Thakur.

See also 
 Karpoori Thakur ministry (1977–79)

References

External links 

 Karpoori Thakur-COMMEMORATIVE STAMP
 Jayaprakash Narayan:Another Rally another day

1924 births
1988 deaths
Chief Ministers of Bihar
Deputy Chief Ministers of Bihar
Finance Ministers of Bihar
Indian socialists
State cabinet ministers of Bihar
People from Samastipur district
Lok Sabha members from Bihar
Samyukta Socialist Party politicians
Janata Party politicians
Bharatiya Lok Dal politicians
Leaders of the Opposition in the Bihar Legislative Assembly
Chief ministers from Janata Party
Bihar MLAs 1952–1957
India MPs 1977–1979
Janata Party (Secular) politicians
Lok Dal politicians